Dünya (literally World) is a Turkish newspaper founded in 1981 by , who was also its editor-in-chief in his lifetime. The newspaper covers mainly business news and has a circulation of around 55,000.

Columnists
 Güngör Uras

References

Newspapers published in Istanbul
Turkish-language newspapers
Publications established in 1981
1981 establishments in Turkey
Business newspapers
Political newspapers
Daily newspapers published in Turkey